The , meaning "Valour Square", is the main square located in the historical centre of the Brussels municipality of Anderlecht, Belgium. It is served by Saint Guidon/Sint Guido metro station on line 5 of the Brussels Metro.

History and layout
The square was originally known as the / ("Plain Square"). In the 1910s, it was considerably enlarged. As early as 1912, historicist style houses fitted with Baroque and neo-Flemish Renaissance gables were erected. A second wave of construction (from 1923 to 1928) followed a redevelopment of the square. 

On the Place de la Vaillance, there was a cinema called Le Vaillance, that opened in 1931 and closed in 1969, and is currently a Dutch-language music academy. At the corner of the square and the / is a 17th-century house which long served as an inn and now houses the Dutch-speaking cultural centre De Rinck.

Surroundings
The Place de la Vaillance is bordered to the north by the Collegiate Church of St. Peter and St. Guido, named after Saint Guy, patron saint of Anderlecht, who died in 1012. This church, mentioned for the first time in 1075, was built in Flamboyant Gothic style between 1350 and 1470. Its square tower was completed in 1898 by the addition of an octagonal spire. Beneath the church lies a Romanesque crypt.

Close to the church is the old beguinage of Anderlecht. This building dates back to the 13th century and was restored in 1634 and 1978. It is currently a museum. Not far from there, on the Rue du Chapitre, is Erasmus House, a late Gothic or early Renaissance style house where the humanist Erasmus of Rotterdam stayed in 1521. This site is now a museum dedicated to Erasmus and the humanist movement. The house is complemented by a garden which includes a space for medicinal herbs. Not far away is the picturesque the /, as well as the Maurice Carême Museum.

See also

 History of Brussels
 Belgium in "the long nineteenth century"

References

Notes

Squares in Brussels
Anderlecht
Protected heritage sites in Brussels
Flemish Renaissance Revival architecture